Elliott Bridge (locally known as Boropool) is an old bridge over the Boral River in Sirajganj, north-western Bangladesh. The pillarless bridge is named after the Lieutenant Governor named Charles Alfred Elliott. It cost 45 thousand takas to make it. It is one of the major attractions of Sirajganj city.

History
The river Boral or Katakhali, which flows through the town named Sirajganj, divides the city into two parts, East and West. Due to its connection with the river Jamuna, the flow of water in this Katakhali was much higher. So in 1892, the then sub-divisional officer Bitson Bell, planned to build a bridge to solve the traffic problem between the two banks.

The Hartland Company built the bridge, designed by Stuart Hartland who was a British engineer. Charles Alfred Elliott, the then Lieutenant Governor of Bengal laid its foundation stone on 6 August 1892. The bridge, named Elliott Bridge, is named after him. The bridge has since been renovated several times.

Funding
It cost Tk 45,000 to build the bridge at that time. Magistrate of Pabna District Julius gave a grant of Tk 15,000 from the district board. The rest of the money was collected from donations from local zamindars and rich people.

Architecture
It is an arch bridge without pillars. The entire structure of the 160 feet long and 18 feet wide bridge is made of steel. Above it was a wooden deck. As they were destroyed, concrete was used later.

The height of the bridge is 30 feet. The bridge was raised and built without pillars so as not to disrupt the movement of large cargo ships plying the Katakhali river. Apart from this, standing on the bridge so that the view of Sirajganj city could be seen was also another reason for building the bridge.

Current status
The bridge is one of the sights of Sirajganj city. In 1962, the construction of the Sirajganj City Protection Dam on the Jamuna made the mouth of a sluice gate at the Baitara end of the Katakhali River and the other mouth closed. In 2019, the re-excavation of the river happened by Sirajganj Water Development Board. The river Jamuna was then connected to Baitara through a switch gate. As a result, water flows in the river and the bridge regains its beauty. Heavy vehicles are not allowed to cross the bridge to protect it.

See also
 Hurasagar River

References

Notes

Citations

Bibliography

Road bridges in Bangladesh
1892 establishments in British India
Bridges completed in 1895
Sirajganj Sadar Upazila
Tourist attractions in Rajshahi Division
Steel bridges in Bangladesh